This is a list of notable council estates. Public housing in the United Kingdom has typically consisted of council houses, often built in the form of large estates by local government councils.

Becontree in The London Borough of Barking & Dagenham is generally considered to be the largest council estate (in terms of population).

Some council estates, such as Heygate Estate (setting of the movie Harry Brown) in London, or Hulme Crescents in Manchester, have since been demolished.

England

London

Largest

Other
Hillingdon
Hackney
 Nightingale Estate
 Kingshold
Haringey
 Broadwater Farm, Tottenham
Islington
 Andover Estate, Upper Holloway
Lewisham
Excalibur Estate, Catford
Merton
 St Helier Estate, Morden
Newham
 Carpenters Estate, Stratford
Redbridge
 Hainault
Southwark
 Aylesbury Estate currently being demolished
 Ledbury Estate, Peckham
 North Peckham Estate, Peckham
 Brandon Estate, Kennington
Sutton
 Roundshaw Estate, Wallington
Tower Hamlets
 Lansbury Estate, Poplar
 Cranbrook Estate, Bethnal Green
 Brownfield Estate, Poplar
 Samuda Estate, Isle Of Dogs
 St John's Estate, Isle Of Dogs
 Barkantine Estate, Millwall
 Wandsworth
Alton Estate, Roehampton

West Midlands

Birmingham
 Druids Heath
 Hawkesley
 Castle Vale

Dudley
 Wren's Nest Estate, Dudley
 Priory Estate, Dudley
 Russells Hall Estate, Dudley
 Chapel Street Estate, Brierley Hill

Sandwell
 Hateley Heath, West Bromwich
 Tantany, West Bromwich
 Friar Park, Wednesbury
 Tibbington, Tipton
 Galton Village, Smethwick

Solihull
 Chelmsley Wood

Walsall
 Coal Pool, Walsall
 Beechdale, Walsall

Wolverhampton
 Ashmore Park, Wednesfield, Wolverhampton 
 The Lunt, Bilston, Wolverhampton

Telford
 Woodside

Greater Manchester

City of Manchester
 Wythenshawe

Tameside
 Hattersley

West Yorkshire

Leeds
 Cottingley
 Halton Moor
 Lincoln Green (Burmantofts)
 Little London
 Lovell Park
 Seacroft

Bradford
 Buttershaw

 Holme Wood (Population 30,000
 Ravenscliffe

South Yorkshire

Sheffield
 Park Hill
 Gleadless Valley
 Parson Cross

North Yorkshire

Middlesbrough

Grove Hill

East Riding of Yorkshire

Kingston upon Hull
 Bransholme
 Orchard Park

Merseyside

Knowsley
 Stockbridge Village

Liverpool
 Norris Green

Norfolk

Norwich
 Mile Cross
 Heartsease

Hampshire

Portsmouth
 Paulsgrove

Havant
 Leigh Park
 Wecock Farm

Southampton
 Townhill Park
 Redbridge
 Thornhill
 Weston
 Northam
 Millbrook

Oxfordshire

Oxford
 Blackbird Leys estate

Surrey

Mole Valley
 Goodwyns, Dorking

Tyne and Wear

Newcastle upon Tyne
 Byker (population approx 9,500)

Sunderland
 Pennywell (population 10,709)

Scotland

Glasgow

 Easterhouse (widely rebuilt)
 Castlemilk (partially rebuilt)
 Drumchapel (partially rebuilt)
 Pollok 
 Red Road (demolished)
 Sighthill (demolished)
 Blackhill (rebuilt)
 Toryglen (partially rebuilt)
 Carnwadric
 Arden
 Hamiltonhill
 Wyndford
 Carntyne
 Riddrie
 Barlanark
 Darnley (rebuilt)
 Ruchazie
 Barmulloch
 Penilee
 Merrylee
 Garthamlock
 Craigend
 Cranhill (partially rebuilt)

Edinburgh

 East Pilton
 Muirhouse
 Greendykes
 Moredun
 Oxgangs
 Cables Wynd House
 Dumbiedykes
 Lochend
 Gilmerton

Dundee
 Whitfield
 Ardler
 Fintry
 Logie
 Menzieshill
 Kirkton

Other
Faifley
Ferguslie Park
Foxbar
Gallowhill
Gowkthrapple
Hillhouse
Whitlawburn

Northern Ireland

Greater Belfast
 Ballybeen
 Rathcoole (Newtownabbey)

Derry
 Creggan

References

Public housing in the United Kingdom
 
Z-UK